Steam Pigs is the 1997 debut novel by Melissa Lucashenko. It concerns Sue Wilson, a young Murri woman, who explores her Indigenous identity while living in Brisbane.

Reception
A review in The Australian Journal of Indigenous Education wrote that "Steam Pigs takes us into the world of today's "untermensch" ...", and that it "..is a woman's book set in a very particular place and at a very particular time; but it confronts themes that are eternal and universal.". A Lesbians on the Loose review called it "...as unsentimental as it is empathetic.".

Steam Pigs has also been reviewed by the Journal of the Association for the Study of Australian Literature, Social Alternatives, Australian Literary Studies, Queensland Review, and Ilha do Desterro. 

An excerpt appears in the Macquarie PEN Anthology of Australian Literature.

Awards
 1998 Dobbie Literary Award winner
 1998 Commonwealth Writers' Prize (South-East Asia and Pacific Region) – shortlist for Best First Book
 1999 New South Wales Premier's Literary Awards shortlist

References

Further reading

External links
 Library holdings of Steam Pigs
 "Re-writing Indigeneity, Questioning Postcoloniality", Maryanne Twomey (2003) - thesis that includes a study of Steam Pigs

1997 Australian novels
1997 debut novels
Novels set in Brisbane
Indigenous Australian literature
University of Queensland Press books